Sexy Eyes is the name of:

"Sexy Eyes" (Dr. Hook song), a 1980 song by Dr. Hook
"Sexy Eyes" (Whigfield song), a 1996 Whigfield song
"Sexy Eyes", a song by Rock Goddess from the album Young and Free